Aung Min is a former Minister of the President's Office of Myanmar (Burma), chairperson of Myanmar Peace Centre and a former Minister for Rail Transportation of Myanmar (Burma). He is also a retired Major General in the Myanmar Army.

Aung Min's daughter, Aye Mya Aung, is married to Burmese rapper and pop singer, Ye Lay. His son, Htoo Char Aung, is a hotelier and USDP politician.

References

Burmese military personnel
Living people
Government ministers of Myanmar
Defence Services Academy alumni
Burmese generals
Union Solidarity and Development Party politicians
Members of Pyithu Hluttaw
1949 births